The sandstone universities are an informally defined group comprising Australia's oldest tertiary education institutions. Most were founded in the colonial era, the exceptions being the University of Queensland (1909) and University of Western Australia (1911). All the universities in the group have buildings constructed primarily of sandstone. Membership of the group is based on age; some universities, such as the private Bond University, have sandstone-plated buildings but are not considered sandstone universities.

The label "sandstone university" is not completely synonymous with membership of the Group of Eight, which includes the Australian National University, Monash University and the University of New South Wales, but not the University of Tasmania. Nevertheless, the connotations (prestige, a focus on research, and curricula that have a strong emphasis on theory rather than practice) are much the same for the two groups. Australian Government survey data of university graduates has indicated in the past that students who enter sandstone universities come from higher income families, and that graduates largely have higher paid occupations or positions of influence, prompting claims of elitism and social division.

Constituent institutions
Sandstone universities can be taken to be either universities founded before World War I, or the oldest university in their respective state; either definition gives the same set of universities.

Gallery

Other Australian university groups

Red brick universities 
The University of New South Wales, Monash University and the Australian National University have been termed 'red brick' universities. They are similar to the red brick universities in the UK, both groups coming after the ancient universities and sandstone universities.

Verdant (gumtree) universities 

Universities founded in the 1960s and 70s have been known informally as 'verdant'  or 'gumtree' universities.
These universities were established in their state capitals, often next to native bush land (now nature reserves), and have lush vegetative campuses. They are predominantly the second or third established university in their state.

See also 
Ivy League
Robbins Report
Russell Group
Association of American Universities
Red brick university
Plate glass university
Maple League of Universities (Canada)

References

Bibliography
 Walden, Scott & Douglas South Australia - Three Universities 2003
 Australian Colonial Period - 1788-1901

Sandstone buildings in Australia
College and university associations and consortia in Australia
Colloquial terms for groups of universities and colleges